Newport is the name of several populated places in the state of Ohio, U.S.A.:

Newport, Madison County, Ohio
Newport, Mahoning County, Ohio
Newport, Shelby County, Ohio
Newport, Tuscarawas County, Ohio
Newport, Washington County, Ohio